Blackfriars Bridge is a road and foot traffic bridge across the River Thames in Central London.

Blackfriars Bridge may also refer to:

 Blackfriars Railway Bridge, running parallel to the road bridge
 Blackfriars Bridge, Manchester
 Blackfriars Street Bridge in London, Ontario
 Blackfriars Bridge (film), a late 19th-century silent film